Agostino Todaro (14 January 1818 – 18 April 1892) was an Italian botanist.

He was born and died in Palermo, Italy. He was a professor of botany and became the director of the botanical gardens in Palermo. He published the Hortus Botanicus Panormitanus in 1876–1878.

In 1843, botanist Filippo Parlatore published Todaroa, which is a genus of flowering plants from the Canary Islands, belonging to the family Apiaceae. It just contains one known species, Todaroa aurea , and it is named after Agostino Todaro.

The standard botanical author abbreviation Tod. is applied to species he described.

Main works
Orchideae siculae sive enumeratio orchidearum in Sicilia hucusque detectarum, Ex Empedoclea Officina, Panormi 1842 
Rapporto della Commissione per l'imboschimento e censuazione di Monte Pellegrino, con G. Schiro, Lima, Palermo 1851. 
Nuovi generi e nuove specie di piante coltivate nel Real Orto Botanico di Palermo, Pagando e Piola, Palermo 1858 
Relazione sui cotoni coltivati al r. Orto botanico nell'anno 1864, Lorsnaider, Palermo 1864. 
Synopsis plantarum acotyledonearum vascularium sponte provenientium in Sicilia insulisque adjacentibus, Lao, Palermo 1866. 
Relazione sui cotoni coltivati nel r. Orto botanico di Palermo nell'anno 1876, Lao, Palermo 1877. 
Relazione sulla cultura dei cotoni in Italia, seguita da una monografia del genere Gossypium, Stamp. Reale, Palermo 1878. 
Sopra una nuova specie di Fourcroya, Lao, Palermo 1879.

References

G.M. Mira, Bibliografia siciliana ovvero Gran Dizionario Bibliografico, vol. II, Gaudiano, Palermo 1881, pp. 414-415, ad vocem 
D. Ottonello, Il ruolo di Vincenzo Tineo e Agostino Todaro nello sviluppo della botanica a Palermo, in G. Liotta (a cura di), I naturalisti e la cultura scientifica siciliana nell'800, Stass, Palermo 1987, pp. 295–310.

External links

Scheda sul sito del Senato 
Scheda sul sito del Comune di Palermo 
Scheda autorità del «Sistema Bibliotecario Nazionale» 

19th-century Italian botanists
Scientists from Palermo
Pteridologists
Botanists with author abbreviations
1818 births
1892 deaths